Datuk Seri Palanivel s/o K. Govindasamy (born 1 March 1949), commonly known as G Palanivel is a Malaysian politician who served as Minister of Natural Resources and Environment from May 2013 to July 2015, Minister in the Prime Minister's Department from August 2011 to May 2013, Deputy Minister of Plantation Industries and Commodities, Deputy Minister of Rural Development, Deputy Minister of Welfare and Family Development, Senator from May 2010 to May 2013, Member of Parliament (MP) for Cameron Highlands from May 2013 to May 2018 and Hulu Selangor from October 1990 to March 2008. He is a member and served as the 8th President of the Malaysian Indian Congress (MIC), a component party of the ruling Barisan Nasional (BN) coalition, from December 2010 to June 2013.

Background 
Palanivel was born in Penang on 1 March 1949. He obtained a Bachelor of Arts from University of Malaya in 1972, majoring in History. Initially he became a teacher at the Goon Institute in Kuala Lumpur and then at Maktab Adabi in Kuantan. In the same year as his graduation, he was elected Secretary of Petaling Branch of Malaysian Indian Congress (MIC), a political party which is part of the ruling coalition. He has been with the party since 1968.

He moved on to become a research assistant at the Muzium Negara (National Museum). In 1974, he went back to Penang to join the Consumer Association of Penang. There he rose to the position of executive director. His next career move was to join Bernama as a journalist in 1977. There he was elevated to become the economic news editor. It was during this period he was invited to become a press secretary to the Minister of Works who was (and is) also the President of MIC. That set the stage for the crucial take-off in his political career. He was chosen as a candidate in the country's general elections in 1990 and had won every single election as a member of parliament ever since until his loss in the 8 March 2008 elections when a tidal wave of voter sentiment against the ruling coalition came to the fore that resulted in the loss of four states out of thirteen to the opposition and in the loss of two-thirds majority in the Parliament.

Positions in the government commenced with Palanivel being appointed as the parliamentary secretary to the Ministry of National Unity. He rose further to become the deputy minister of Rural Development of Malaysia from 1999 until 2004 when he was made the deputy minister of Welfare and Family Development. He continued as the deputy minister until his defeat in the March 2008 general elections.

Palanivel also had a stint in the corporate circle as a business adviser to Sports Toto and as  one of the member of the board of directors of Telekom Malaysia.

Palanivel married Kanagam Palanivel and the couple has four sons.

Political future 
In June 2006, Palanivel, previously a vice-president of MIC, entered a new era of top level MIC leadership by defeating a 27-year incumbent, Dato' S Subramaniam, to become the new deputy president of MIC. He retained his position in the MIC elections concluded on 12 September 2009. Palanivel, was appointed MIC president to replace S Samy Vellu on 6 December 2010.

Palanivel's position hitherto has been a Deputy Minister from 1999 until March 2008 when he failed to secure his parliamentary seat in the 2008 elections.
Following the massive defeat of MIC representatives in the 2008 general elections, MIC's top leadership is conspicuously absent in the cabinet of the ruling coalition, Barisan Nasional that is made up of largely race based parties dominated by the Malay-based UMNO. It is the more junior members of MIC leadership who won in the General Elections who hold one ministerial and two deputy ministerial posts allocated for the party. Moreover, in the April 2009 new government line-up, MIC's representation had been reduced.

Although the Barisan Nasional coalition won the 2008 general elections, it lost its previous eminent of position of securing parliamentary seats exceeding two-thirds majority. In the same elections, serious gains including capturing of five states out the total of thirteen have been made by the alternative coalition, Pakatan Rakyat.

On 3 May 2010, G Palanivel was appointed as a Senator in the Parliament Upper House.

Palanivel returned to the federal cabinet portfolio and was appointed Deputy Minister of Plantation Industries and Commodities after a minor Cabinet reshuffle on 4 June 2010.

On 6 December 2010, G Palanivel was appointed as the 8th MIC President succeeding Samy Vellu who had held the post for 31 years.

On 5 May 2013, G Palanivel won the Cameron Highlands Parliament seat in the 13th Malaysian General Election. The Malaysian Indian Congress won 4 (Cameron Highlands, Segamat, Hulu Selangor, Tapah) Parliament seats in total and 5 (Gambir, Kahang, Tenggaroh, Gadek, Jeram Padang) State seats, an extra seat compared to the previous election in Malaysia. He was then appointed as Minister of Natural Resources and Environment.

On 3 July 2013, G Palanivel said that MIC was against the controversial bill which allows unilateral conversion of child below 18 years old into Islam.

On 5 July 2013, G Palanivel commented "It was a fair move taking into consideration the sensitivities of various stakeholders and groups. MIC still stands by its statement that the consent of both parents are needed for the conversion of children to Islam," after the controversial bill on conversion of minors was withdrawn by the Malaysian ruling government Barisan Nasional.

Election results

Honours
 ：
 Knight Companion of the Order of Sultan Salahuddin Abdul Aziz Shah (DSSA) — Dato’ (1996)
 ：
 Grand Commander of the Order of the Territorial Crown (SMW) — Datuk Seri (2012)

References

External links
 

1948 births
Living people
People from Penang
Malaysian people of Tamil descent
Malaysian Hindus
Malaysian politicians of Tamil descent
Malaysian politicians of Indian descent
Presidents of Malaysian Indian Congress
Malaysian people of Indian descent
Independent politicians in Malaysia
Members of the Dewan Negara
Members of the Dewan Rakyat
Government ministers of Malaysia
University of Malaya alumni
21st-century Malaysian politicians